Taringa aivica is a species of sea slug, a dorid nudibranch, shell-less marine gastropod mollusks in the family Discodorididae.

Distribution
This species was described from Fort Kobbe Beach, Panama, Pacific Ocean. It has been reported from Bahía de Banderas, Mexico and from the Palos Verdes peninsula in Los Angeles County to Bahía Tortugas, Baja California and the Sonoran coast of the Gulf of California.

References

Discodorididae
Gastropods described in 1967